Saihou is a Gambian masculine given name. Notable people with the name include:

Saihou Gassama (born 1993), Gambian football midfielder
Saihou Jagne (born 1986), Swedish-Gambian football striker
Saihou Sarr (born 1951), Gambian footballer

African masculine given names